Yisela Cuesta Bejarano (born 27 September 1991) is a Colombian professional footballer who plays as a forward for Brazilian Série A1 club Ferroviária and the Colombia women's national team.

References

External links 
 

1991 births
Living people
Sportspeople from Antioquia Department
Colombian women's footballers
Women's association football forwards
Atlético Nacional (women) players
Clube Atlético Mineiro (women) players
Campeonato Brasileiro de Futebol Feminino Série A1 players
Colombia women's international footballers
2015 FIFA Women's World Cup players
Colombian expatriate women's footballers
Colombian expatriate sportspeople in Brazil
Expatriate women's footballers in Brazil